The Zaratan is a grandiose sea turtle found in literature and folk lore. Zaratans are notable for their long-life span and impossible size. Zaratan shells are easily mistaken for small islands, similar to the whale-like Fastitocalon. The Zaratan is catalogued in Jorge Luis Borges's El Libro de Los Seres Imaginarios (The Book of Imaginary Beings). Zaratans also appear in some editions of the tabletop roleplaying game Dungeons & Dragons.

Borges notes that one of the oldest legends of the Zaratan mentions it dismissively: Al-Jahiz, an Arab prose writer and zoologist in the 9th century, described Zaratan as an innocent story in his book Kitāb al-Hayawān (The Book of Animals). He contrasts this telling with later writings, including by 13th century author Zakariya al-Qazwini, which tell the story of the Zaratan without the incredulity found in the earlier work.

See also
Aspidochelone
World Turtle

References

Legendary turtles
Maritime folklore
Sea monsters